The Bill Emerson Memorial Bridge is a cable-stayed bridge connecting Missouri's Route 34 and Route 74 with Illinois Route 146 across the Mississippi River between Cape Girardeau, Missouri and East Cape Girardeau, Illinois.

It was built just south of its predecessor, the Cape Girardeau Bridge, which was completed in 1928 and demolished in 2004. Prior to its destruction, it was documented for the Library of Congress Historic American Engineering Record Survey number HAER MO-84.

The bridge is named after Bill Emerson, a Missouri politician who served in the U.S. House of Representatives from 1981 until his death in 1996. Planning for the four-lane structure began in June 1987, and construction began in late 1996. Several factors have been blamed for the bridge's many delays in planning and construction, including Illinois' reluctance to participate in the project, as well as issues with the bedrock of the river (this resulted in the hiring of a new contractor).

The bridge was featured in the 2014 David Fincher film Gone Girl.

See also
List of crossings of the Upper Mississippi River

References

External links
Emerson Memorial Bridge

Cable-stayed bridges in the United States
Towers in Missouri
Towers in Illinois
Bridges over the Mississippi River
Bridges completed in 1928
Bridges completed in 2003
Road bridges in Illinois
Buildings and structures in Cape Girardeau, Missouri
Road bridges in Missouri
Buildings and structures in Cape Girardeau County, Missouri
1928 establishments in the United States
Interstate vehicle bridges in the United States